Long Branch is a  long 2nd order tributary to the Trent River in Jones County, North Carolina, United States.

Course
Long Branch rises about 5 miles northwest of Jones Corner, North Carolina and then flows southwest to join the Trent River about 1.5 miles northwest of Oak Grove.

Watershed
Long Branch drains  of area, receives about 53.8 in/year of precipitation, has a wetness index of 561.31, and is about 21% forested.

See also
List of rivers of North Carolina

References

Rivers of North Carolina
Rivers of Jones County, North Carolina